Life Music: Stage Two is the second studio album from Jonathan McReynolds. Entertainment One Music released the album on September 18, 2015. McReynolds worked with these producers on this album: Warryn Campbell, Darhyl "DJ" Camper Jr., Chuck Harmony, Israel Houghton, Darryl "Lil Man" Howell, India.Arie, Claude Kelly, Aaron Lindsay, PJ Morton, and Shannon Sanders.

Critical reception

Awarding the album four stars at CCM Magazine, Andy Argyrakis states, "hey bring a much needed dose of unswerving spiritual substance to anyone searching for something deeper." Dwayne Lacy, giving the album four and a half stars from New Release Today, writes, "Life Music: Stage Two is a great album lyrically, sonically and organically." Rating the album five stars for Journal of Gospel Music, Bob Marovich says, "Life Music, Stage Two is the musical manifestation of his honest and spiritually grounded approach to dealing with the vicissitudes of daily life." Stephen Luff, assigning the album a nine out of ten for Cross Rhythms, describes, "'Life Music: Stage Two' presents a developing artist who writes music that relates to his audience."

Track listing

Chart performance

References

2015 albums
Jonathan McReynolds albums
E1 Music albums